Milunović is a Serbian surname derived from a masculine given name Milun. It may refer to:

Luka Milunović (born 1992), footballer
Nemanja Milunović (born 1989), football defender
Nenad Milunović (born 1983), football midfielder
Mihael Milunović (born 1967), artist
Milo Milunović (1897–1967), painter

Serbian surnames
Slavic-language surnames
Patronymic surnames